Jan Hendrik Stander (born 4 January 1982) is a cricketer who represents Scotland. An all-rounder, Stander bats right handed and bowls right arm medium-fast. He was a member of the Scotland squad for the 2009 ICC World Cup Qualifier, during which he made his debut in One Day Internationals (ODIs). He has also played first-class and List A cricket for Scotland.

Career
Stander moved to Scotland from his native South Africa in 2003. He began playing for Aberdeenshire Cricket Club that year, and remained with the club until 2006. By 2007 Stander was a cricket development officer for the Grampian region. Early that year he coached Scotland Under-15s on their tour of South Africa. For the 2007 season Stander moved to Stoneywood-Dyce; by 2008 he was the club's captain and led them to promotion in the Lloyds TSB Scotland League Division 1. By virtue of residing in the country for four years, in October 2008 Stander became eligible to represent Scotland at international level.

Three months after qualifying, he was called into the national squad for the first time; he was the only uncapped played in Scotland's 15-man squad for the 2009 World Cup Qualifier hosted by South Africa in April. It was felt that Stander's experience of South African conditions would be useful. His selection sparked debate about the state of Scottish cricket as some coaches were concerned that players born in the country were not being given enough opportunities. At the time, 3 of the 15 players in the squad were born outside Scotland. Stander brushed off the criticism, saying "I don't mind because I thrive under pressure. People have strong opinions on foreign players turning out for other countries, but if you love the game, you do all that's possible to play at the highest level." During the tournament, on 1 April Stander made his ODI debut against Ireland. Scotland had a poor tournament, finishing in the top six of the tournament, which was enough to retain the team's ODI status but not to qualify for the 2011 World Cup. In ten matches Stander scored 213 runs, making him Scotland's fourth-highest run-scorer in the tournament (the top three all scored more than 350), and was the team's third-highest wicket-taker with 13 dismissals.

References

1982 births
Living people
Cricketers from Port Elizabeth
Scottish cricketers
Scotland One Day International cricketers
Scotland Twenty20 International cricketers
South African emigrants to the United Kingdom